161st meridian may refer to:

161st meridian east, a line of longitude east of the Greenwich Meridian
161st meridian west, a line of longitude west of the Greenwich Meridian